Logan Owen (born March 25, 1995) is an American professional racing cyclist. Owen formerly rode for UCI WorldTeam . He won a stage of the 2015 Larry H. Miller Tour of Utah on the road. In August 2019, he was named in the startlist for the 2019 Vuelta a España.

Career

Junior career
At the age of five, Owen began testing Redline's new titanium BMX frame.

Bissell Development Team (2014–17)
Owen joined the then-, run by Axel Merckx, for the 2014 season.

In 2016, Owen won the U23 Liège–Bastogne–Liège coming out of a long distance breakaway, ultimately crossing the line alone.

EF Education First–Drapac (2018–present)
In September 2017, it was announced that Owen would join  for the 2018 season.

Personal life
Owen was married to fellow professional cyclist, Chloé Dygert. However, the marriage ended in divorce in January 2020.

Major results

Cyclo-cross

2004–2005
 1st  National Junior Championships
2005–2006
 1st  National Junior Championships
2006–2007
 1st  National Junior Championships
2007–2008
 1st  National Junior Championships
2008–2009
 1st  National Junior Championships
2009–2010
 1st  National Junior Championships
2011–2012
 1st  National Junior Championships
2012–2013
 1st  National Junior Championships
 1st Cyclo-cross Namur (junior)
2013–2014
 1st  National Under-23 Championships
2014–2015
 1st  National Under-23 Championships
 2nd Pan-American Championships

Road

2013
 1st  Road race, National Junior Road Championships
 1st  National Junior Criterium Championships
 2nd Overall Course de la Paix Juniors
 4th Road race, UCI Junior Road World Championships
2014
 8th Paris–Roubaix Espoirs
2015
 1st Stage 3 Tour of Utah
2016
 1st Liège–Bastogne–Liège Espoirs
2017
 6th Overall Volta ao Alentejo
1st Stage 4

Grand Tour general classification results timeline

References

External links

 

1995 births
Living people
American male cyclists
People from Bremerton, Washington
Cyclists from Washington (state)
Cyclo-cross cyclists